BAFO as an acronym may refer to:

 Best And Final Offer, often a part of a Request For Proposal process
 British Association of Forensic Odontology
 BAFO Technologies Incorporated, manufacturer of cables and electronic devices
 British Air Forces of Occupation, forerunner of the RAF Second Tactical Air Force in Germany